Neuenkirchen is a municipality in the district of Steinfurt, in North Rhine-Westphalia, Germany. Neuenkirchen is the biggest village in the district of Steinfurt. It is situated approximately 7 km south-west of Rheine and 35 km north-west of Münster.

Geography

Neighbouring places
 Wettringen
 Steinfurt
 Emsdetten
 Rheine
 Salzbergen

Division of the municipality
 
 Offlum
 Sutrum-Harum
 Landersum

Politics

Town assembly

After the local elections on September 26, 2004 the town assembly has the following structure:
 CDU 15 seats
 SPD 5 seats
 Green Party 2 seats
 FDP 1 seats
 UWG 3 seats

Sons and daughters of the community 
  
 Johannes Georg Bednorz (born 1950), physicist and Nobel laureate, a residential street bears his name (Georg-Bednorz-Strasse).
 Josef F. Bille (born 1944), physicist and inventor, bearer of the European Inventive Price
 Isaac Leeser (1806-1868), American Jewish religious leader, teacher, scholar and publisher
 August Rohling (1839-1931), theologian and anti-Semite
 Hans Weiner (born 1950), footballer
 André Wiwerink (born 1980), footballer

References

External links
  

Steinfurt (district)